Camden County is a consolidated city-county located in the U.S. State of North Carolina. As of the 2020 census, the population was 10,335, making it the fourth-least populous county in North Carolina. Its county seat is Camden. Camden County is part of the Elizabeth City, NC Micropolitan Statistical Area, which is also included in the Virginia Beach-Norfolk, VA-NC Combined Statistical Area.

History
The county was formed in 1777 from the northeastern part of Pasquotank County. It was named for Charles Pratt, 1st Lord Camden, who had opposed the Stamp Act. The county is the site of the southern terminus of the Dismal Swamp Canal. It was the site of the Battle of South Mills on April 19, 1862, during the American Civil War, which was a minor victory to the Confederacy.

Shiloh Baptist Church, founded around 1727 by Paul Palmer, is the oldest Baptist church in North Carolina. It is located in the Shiloh township.

Though technically there are (or were) no incorporated municipalities in Camden County (with the exception of a small portion of Elizabeth City, most of which is in bordering Pasqoutank County), the county became the first consolidated city-county entity in North Carolina in June 2006.

Camden County is the location of Academi's Blackwater Lodge and Training Center for paramilitary and security operations.

Geography

National protected area
 Great Dismal Swamp National Wildlife Refuge (part)

State and local protected areas 
 Dismal Swamp State Park
 North River Game Land Dedicated Nature Preserve (part)

Major water bodies 
 Albemarle Sound
 Intracoastal Waterway
 North River
 Pasquotank River

Adjacent counties
 City of Suffolk, Virginia - north
 City of Chesapeake, Virginia - north
 Gates County - northwest
 Currituck County - east
 Tyrrell County - south
 Pasquotank County - southwest

Major highways
  (Concurrency with US 17)

Demographics

2020 census

As of the 2020 United States census, there were 10,355 people, 3,933 households, and 3,154 families residing in the county.

2010 census
As of the census of 2010, there were 9,980 people, 2,662 households, and 2,023 families residing in the county.  The population density was 29 people per square mile (11/km2).  There were 2,973 housing units at an average density of 12/sq mi (5/km2).  The racial makeup of the county was 82.1% White, 13.2% Black or African American, 0.3% Native American, 1.5% Asian, 0.1% Pacific Islander, 0.7% from other races, and 2.1% from two or more races.  2.2% of the population were Hispanic or Latino of any race.

There were 2,662 households, out of which 31.60% had children under the age of 18 living with them, 62.20% were married couples living together, 9.40% had a female householder with no husband present, and 24.00% were non-families. 20.70% of all households were made up of individuals, and 9.50% had someone living alone who was 65 years of age or older.  The average household size was 2.58 and the average family size was 2.97.

In the county, the population was spread out, with 24.50% under the age of 18, 6.30% from 18 to 24, 30.50% from 25 to 44, 25.20% from 45 to 64, and 13.60% who were 65 years of age or older.  The median age was 39 years. For every 100 females there were 98.40 males.  For every 100 females age 18 and over, there were 96.90 males.

The median income for a household in the county was $39,493, and the median income for a family was $45,387. Males had a median income of $36,274 versus $24,875 for females. The per capita income for the county was $18,681.  10.10% of the population and 7.90% of families were below the poverty line.  Out of the total people living in poverty, 12.60% are under the age of 18 and 20.30% are 65 or older.

Government and politics
Camden County is a member of the Albemarle Commission regional council of governments and is represented by Bobby Hanig in the 1st district in the North Carolina State Senate and Edward Charles Goodwin in the 1st district in the North Carolina House of Representatives.

Education
There are five schools in Camden County: Grandy Primary School, Camden Intermediate School, Camden Middle School, Camden County High School, and Camden Early College. However one other former school lies in Shiloh. It was a community school for the Shiloh area. The Shiloh School sign is still visible on the top of the facade at the front of the building.

Communities

City
 Elizabeth City (consolidated with county, mostly in Pasquotank County)

Towns
 Camden (county seat and largest town)

Census-designated places
 South Mills

Other unincorporated communities
 Old Trap

Townships
 Camden
 Shiloh
 South Mills

See also
 List of counties in North Carolina
 National Register of Historic Places listings in Camden County, North Carolina
 North Carolina State Parks
 List of future Interstate Highways

References

External links

 
 
 Elizabeth City Area Convention and Visitors Bureau

 
Elizabeth City, North Carolina micropolitan area
1777 establishments in North Carolina
Populated places established in 1777